Generation Nightmare is the twelfth studio album by American hip hop duo Twiztid. It was released on April 26, 2019 through Majik Ninja Entertainment with distribution via INgrooves. Recording sessions took place at the Dojo in Michigan. Production was handled by A Danger Within, Michael "Seven" Summers, YYBeats, Godsynth, Young Wicked, Fritz the Cat and Lunar⋆Vision. The album has been described as a "rap-rock manifesto".

It features guest appearances from Alla Xul Elu, Young Wicked and Tuckas Budghras.

Track listing

Personnel
James "Madrox" Spaniolo – main performer, additional producer (track 4)
Paul "Monoxide" Methric – main performer, additional producer (track 4)
James "Young Wicked" Garcia – performer (track 14), producer (track 3), additional producer (tracks: 4, 17), mixing (tracks: 1, 3, 4, 6-9, 11-15, 17-20)
Tuckas Budghras – performer (track 19)
Alla Xul Elu – performer (track 20)
Leor Dimant – scratches (tracks: 2, 15)
John Sustar – scratches (track 8)
Drayven Davidson – percussion, live drums, producer (tracks: 1, 2, 5, 10, 16, 17)
Jared Farrell – producer (tracks: 1, 2, 5, 10, 16, 17)
Michael "Seven" Summers – producer (tracks: 4, 7, 8, 11)
YYBeats – producer (tracks: 12-14, 18)
Brett "GodSynth" Saunders – producer (tracks: 6, 9, 15)
Fritz "The Cat" Van Kosky – producer (track 19), recording, engineering
Lunar⋆Vision – producer (track 20)
Johnny Andrews – mixing (tracks: 2, 5, 10, 16)
Paul Logus – mastering
Eric Shetler – design, layout
Austin Pardun – additional design
George Vhalakis – management

Charts

References

External links

2019 albums
Twiztid albums
Majik Ninja Entertainment albums
Albums produced by Seven (record producer)